Ransdell is a surname. Notable people with the surname include:

 Joseph E. Ransdell (1858–1954), U.S. senator from Louisiana, author of the Ransdell Act creating the National Institutes of Health; brother of Francis Xavier Ransdell
 Joseph Morton Ransdell (1931–2010), American philosopher
 Sanford Ransdell (1781–1854), Indiana pioneer